High Melton is a village and civil parish in the Metropolitan Borough of Doncaster in South Yorkshire, England. It has a population of 339. reducing to 300 at the 2011 Census.

In August 2019, 13 men and women fell ill after accidentally ingesting cannabis concealed in cakes during a national festival for metal detectorists called 'Coil to the Soil'.

See also
Listed buildings in High Melton

References

External links

High Melton, Doncaster and District Family History Society

Villages in Doncaster
Civil parishes in South Yorkshire